John Davison (20 July 1828 – 10 May 1871) was an English cricketer. He played seven first-class matches for Kent between 1851 and 1863.

References

External links
 

1828 births
1871 deaths
Cricketers from Kent
English cricketers
Gentlemen of Kent cricketers
Kent cricketers